Surya Prasad Pradhan is a Nepalese politician. He was elected to the Pratinidhi Sabha in the 1999 election on behalf of the Nepali Congress. Pradhan is the NC candidate in the Rupandehi-4 constituency for the 2008 Constituent Assembly election.

References

Living people
Nepali Congress politicians from Lumbini Province
Year of birth missing (living people)
Nepal MPs 1999–2002